Total Defence may refer to:

Defence policy
 Total defence, the general concept in defence policy.
 Total Defence (Singapore), the defence strategy introduced in Singapore in 1984.
 National CBRN Defence Centre (Totalförsvarets skyddscentrum), also known as the Total Defence Protection Center in Sweden.

Sports
 Total offense, strategy in football.

Software
 CA Anti-Spyware, computer software provided by Total Defense Inc.